Elizabeth Goudie (née Blake; April 20, 1902, Mud Lake, Colony of Newfoundland – June 10, 1982 Happy Valley, Labrador) was an Inuit Canadian writer. Her sole work, Woman of Labrador was published in 1973.

Life
Elizabeth Blake was born April 20, 1902, at Mud Lake, Labrador, Colony of Newfoundland the daughter of Sarah Michelin and Joseph Blake. Goudie's great aunt, Lydia Campbell, wrote the book Sketches of Labrador Life.

At the age of 18, she married Jim Goudie, a trapper, with whom she had nine children, one of whom, Joe, served as member of the House of Assembly for Naskaupi (1975–85) and held several portfolios in the administrations of Frank Moores and Brian Peckford.

In 1963, her husband died and Elizabeth began to reminisce about her life and decided to write it out, finishing in June 1971.

David Zimmerly, an anthropological researcher from Memorial University, stationed in Happy Valley, heard of Goudie's memoirs and went to talk to her. He volunteered to help her edit the memoirs for publication and spent much time during the next two years working with her. The book was published by Peter Martin Associates of Ottawa in July 1973. The original manuscript is archived in the Newfoundland and Labrador Room of the library of Memorial University.

Honours
In 1975, in recognition of her life and work, she was awarded an honorary Doctor of Laws degree from Memorial University. In 1980, the provincial government building in Happy Valley-Goose Bay was named after her.

A song Woman Of Labrador was written by Andy Vine in 2005.

A play, "Woman of Labrador; The Elizabeth Goudie Story", starring Sherry Smith, was made from her book.

References

Sources
 Blake, Dale, Women of Labrador: realigning North from the site(s) of metissage.,  Essays on Canadian Writing, (September 22, 1996).

External links 
 Biography of Elizabeth Goudie on inuit.uqam.ca.
 entry in the Canadian Encyclopedia.
 Churchill River - The Lonely Season: Traditional bush life in Labrador

1902 births
1982 deaths
Canadian memoirists
Writers from Newfoundland and Labrador
People from Happy Valley-Goose Bay
Canadian women memoirists
20th-century Canadian women writers
20th-century Canadian non-fiction writers
20th-century memoirists